"Billy S." is a song by Canadian musician Skye Sweetnam. It was released as her debut major label single in 2003. "Billy S." reached number 15 on the Canadian Singles Chart and also charted in France and the Flanders region of Belgium. The song was featured on the soundtrack to the movie How to Deal.

Song information
The song's title, "Billy S." stands for Billy Shakespeare, a reference to William Shakespeare, whom Skye refers to throughout the song. Sweetnam thought that the title "Billy Shakespeare" was too long, and decided to shorten it.

Music video
The music video for "Billy S.", filmed in Southern California, features Skye Sweetnam recording herself singing into a hand held camera. The video then goes on to show Sweetnam editing the video on a computer. The video also features scenes from the movie How to Deal. Skye is also shown, while making her video, gathering a group of people for the purpose of throwing a party and ultimately skipping school, walking triumphantly past the (school) bus.

The video for "Billy S." received regular airplay on MuchMusic and YTV.

Track listings
Canadian CD single
 "Billy S."
 "Wild World"

European CD single
 "Billy S."
 "Tidal Wave"

French DVD single
 "Billy S."
 "Tidal Wave"
 "Billy S." (video)

Charts

Release history

References

2003 debut singles
2003 songs
Capitol Records singles
Skye Sweetnam songs
Songs about William Shakespeare
Songs written by Jamie Robertson